The Algerian football champions are the winners of the primary football league in Algeria, Algerian Ligue Professionnelle 1. The league is contested on a round robin basis and the championship is awarded to the team that is top of the league at the end of the season.  Algerian football league, first established in 1962, originally contained fifty two teams. Ligue 1 is contested by 16 teams; the three lowest-placed teams are relegated to the Ligue 2 and replaced by the top three teams in that division. Of the founding teams in Algerian football league

List of champions

 Note:
 1962 - 2010 : Algerian Championnat National (Algerian National Championship)
 from 2010 : Algerian Ligue Professionnelle 1 (Algerian Professional League 1)

Titles by club 
Teams in bold compete in the Ligue Professionnelle 1 as of 2021–22 season.
In total, 15 clubs have won the Algerian championship, The record champions are JS Kabylie with 14 titles.

Total titles won by region

See also
Football in Algeria
Algerian football league system

Notes
A.  Hamra Annaba were known as Union sportive musulmane Annaba from 1962 until 1983.

B.  CR Belouizdad were known as Chabab Riadhi Belcourt from 1962 until 1977.

C.  JS Kabylie were known as Jamiat Sari' Kawkabi from 1974 until 1977.

D.  MC Alger were known as Mouloudia Pétroliers d'Alger from 1977 until 1986.

E.  JS Kabylie were known as Jeunesse Électronique de Tizi-Ouzou from 1977 until 1989.

F.  RC Kouba were known as Raed Solb de Kouba from 1974 until 1989.

G.  GC Mascara were known as Ghali Chabab Raï de Mascara from 1979 until 1987.

H.  ES Setif were known as Entente Plastique de Sétif from 1984 until 1988.

Notes

References

Champions
Algeria